The BankMuscat Brokerage is the leading brokerage firm in Oman, with a 13% market share in 2010 based on volume traded, ranking them as the number 1 Brokerage Company  on the Muscat Securities Market (MSM) for 9 out of the last 10 years and a subsidiary of BankMuscat.  Its brokerage team services foreign and domestic entities, high net worth individuals and retail clients.

In 2011, BankMuscat began execution for the Gulf Cooperation Council (GCC) markets. The bank is also implementing the Reuters Order Routing (ROR) which would give the firm electronic access and execution to all the GCC markets. The bank also offers both local institutions, high-net-worth clients and retail clients investment opportunities in India through its investment in Mangal Keshav Securities Ltd, in addition to a robust electronic trading platform for the MSM, which will be expanded to include the GCC markets. BankMuscat has an experienced dealing team and a desk which operates depending on the market in which it executes.

The bank's equity research has an active and dormant coverage on 81% of the MSM's market capitalisation (Ex-BankMuscat). BankMuscat covers stocks in Saudi Arabia and Qatar, and in the past has covered stocks across all GCC markets. The division produces daily news and technical reports, market wrap reports, visit notes and fundamental company reports. BankMuscat's focus has been on providing fundamental reports after extensive interaction with the company management, the key step in equity research process which is not compromised.

The team actively assists the brokerage arm in equity sales efforts through regular client briefings and has strong rapport with company management which helps in aiding clients' due diligence process.

References

External links 
 https://web.archive.org/web/20110723140115/http://www.bankmuscat.com/en-us/PressReleases/Pages/pressreleases217.aspx
 http://thecopykat.wordpress.com/2009/02/16/bankmuscat-direct-online-trading/
 http://www.gulfbase.com/site/interface/NewsArchiveDetails.aspx?n=84113
 https://web.archive.org/web/20120310224103/http://www.omanforum.com/forums/showthread.php?21102-Bank-Muscat-Providing-On-Line-Trading
 https://www.elsob7.news/

Brokerage firms